Jacinto "Jumping Jack" Ciria Cruz (August 16, 1910 – December 25, 1944) was a Filipino basketball player and coach. Ciria Cruz played for the University of Santo Tomas men's basketball team and also represented the Philippines at the 1936 Summer Olympics as a member of the country's national basketball team. He later ventured into coaching different collegiate squads.

In 1938, Ciria Cruz took over as Letran basketball coach from Herminio Silva, who had earlier inherited the job from Ciria Cruz when the latter played in the Berlin Olympics. It was the year Letran wins its first NCAA cage title.

He was killed during World War II.

References

External links
 

1910 births
1944 deaths
People from Pandacan
Filipino men's basketball coaches
Olympic basketball players of the Philippines
Basketball players at the 1936 Summer Olympics
Philippines men's national basketball team players
Filipino men's basketball players
Filipino military personnel killed in World War II
UST Growling Tigers basketball players
Letran Knights basketball coaches